Opsithrissops is an extinct genus of prehistoric bony fish that lived during the Thanetian stage of the Paleocene epoch. It is a  fish in the family Osteoglossiformes which includes other bony-tongues such as the extant species of Arowana and Arapaima.

See also

 Prehistoric fish
 List of prehistoric bony fish

References

Paleocene fish
Osteoglossiformes
Cenozoic animals of Asia